Fiona Zedde (born January 24, 1976) is the pen name of Jamaican-born American fiction writer Fiona Lewis . Her 2005 novel, Bliss, was a finalist for the Lambda Literary Award for début Lesbian Fiction.

Background
Lewis was born in Hampton Court, Jamaica, in 1976, an only child to Dorothy Lindsay and Danny Lewis. At the age of twelve, she moved to the United States with her mother and has lived there ever since. She received an M.F.A. in creative writing from San Diego State University.

Zedde is the author of six novels: Bliss, A Taste of Sin, Every Dark Desire, Hungry for It, Dangerous Pleasures, and Broken in Soft Places. She has also written three novellas: Pure Pleasure, Going Wild, and Sexual Attraction published in the collections Satisfy Me, Satisfy Me Again and Satisfy Me Tonight, respectively. Her first novel, Bliss, and the third, Every Dark Desire, were both finalists for the Lambda Literary Award. Her seventh novel, Desire at Dawn'', will be published in June 2014.

Personal life
She is a lesbian. Zedde lives in Madrid, Spain.

References

External links
 

American women novelists
American lesbian writers
LGBT African Americans
Living people
1976 births
Jamaican LGBT writers
Jamaican emigrants to the United States
20th-century American novelists
American LGBT writers
20th-century American women writers
20th-century Jamaican novelists
21st-century Jamaican novelists
Jamaican women novelists
21st-century American women writers
20th-century African-American women
20th-century African-American people
21st-century African-American women writers
21st-century African-American writers
American LGBT novelists